Westernach may refer to:

 Westernach (Danube), a river of Baden-Württemberg, Germany, tributary of the Danube
 Westernach (Mindel), a river of Bavaria, Germany, tributary of the Mindel